Persatuan Sepakbola Pasangkayu (simply known as Pespa Pasangkayu) is an Indonesian football club based in Pasangkayu Regency, West Sulawesi. They currently compete in the Liga 3.

References

External links

Football clubs in Indonesia
Football clubs in West Sulawesi
Association football clubs established in 1956
1956 establishments in Indonesia